The New Orleans Regional Transit Authority (RTA or NORTA) is a public transportation agency based in New Orleans. The agency was established by the Louisiana State Legislature in 1979, and has operated bus and historic streetcar service throughout the city since 1983. With an annual ridership of over 18.6 million riders, the Regional Transit Authority is the largest public transit agency in the state of Louisiana.

Basic rates for all modes, except ferries, are $1.25 per boarding (or $0.40 for 65 & up, disabled & Medicare, $0.50 for 5-17). 24-hour Jazzy Passes are $3, or $1 for youth and $0.80 for seniors, good for all modes including ferries. There are free transfer cards, good for next 120 minutes of unlimited use (round-trips/stopovers prohibited). Under 5 with a limit of three per paid rider can board for free. Transfers to ferries from busses/streetcars require paying difference in rates.

Hurricane Katrina
City buses were used before Hurricane Katrina hit to transport people to a refuge of last resort, of what's now the Caesars Superdome. Much of the city flooded due to the storm. Almost eighty-five percent of the fleet was rendered useless and inoperative;  146 city buses were visible outdoors in the flood at the 2817 Canal St. facility, while only 22 were at 3900 Desire Pky. The 8201 Willow St. facility was one block within the flood but was built above street level. The buses at the flooded facilities were mostly written off.

All but one of the streetcars built in the 1990s and 2000s were severely damaged in the flooding resulting from the hurricane. The historic Perley Thomas-built streetcars of the St. Charles line were undamaged in the disaster. The damaged streetcars, which had been built by hand on the property by local workers, were repaired in the same facility with components from Brookville Equipment Co.

Post-disaster recovery
, service had been restored to certain areas as they became habitable again. However, there was no 24-hour service on any bus or streetcar line, except for the St. Charles streetcar line. Streetcars were returned to the full length of Canal St. and the Riverfront, initially using the historic St. Charles Line streetcars, which had not been damaged, as had the red Canal cars. In 2008, the St. Charles streetcar resumed running the entire length of its route. By early 2009, the red Canal streetcars were repaired and had taken over service on the Canal and Riverfront Lines.

The buses that have been restored to operation have returned to several major thoroughfares, including Elysian Fields Avenue, Esplanade Avenue, Claiborne Avenue, St. Claude Avenue, Judge Perez Drive, General Meyer Avenue, Lapalco Boulevard, Robert E. Lee Boulevard, and the Chef Menteur Highway. And just a few express routes, Morrison Express, Lake Forest Express, Read-Crowder Express and Airport Express, serving both Eastern New Orleans, and New Orleans Louis Armstrong International Airport in Kenner, La. have been reinstated so far.

Service enhancements as of October 2, 2016:

Operate the new N. Rampart/St. Claude Avenue streetcar from Elysian Fields to UPT via Rampart St. and Loyola Ave.  Loyola/UPT line will no longer operate on Canal St. to the river, nor on Riverfront to the French Quarter stop.

Restore service to Canal Street on the 15-Freret and 28-MLK buses.

Increase service on the Canal and Riverfront streetcar lines.

Continue lines 57-Franklin and 88-St. Claude to Canal St.  Operate 57-Franklin via Claiborne Ave. to increase service along N. Claiborne Ave. between Elysian Fields and St. Bernard Ave.

Decrease travel times for riders from farther-out neighborhoods by operating Lines 88-St. Claude and 91-Jackson/Esplanade with fewer stops along Rampart to Canal.

Improve reliability of lines 5-Marigny/Bywater and 55-Elysian Fields with new schedules.

Provide earlier daily trips and later weekend trips on line 80-Desire/Louisa.

New Links Bus Routes 
In September of 2022, the New Orleans Regional Transit Authority announced that they would be almost entirely changing the lines, names, and wait times for the authority starting on September 25, 2022. The changes were made after a survey was conducted containing 3,000 people saying that the old lines had been outdated, and were not convenient for everyday use. For 4 days after the new routes started, RTA offered free boarding on all buses, streetcars, and the Algiers Point Ferry.

The changes were part of the New Links Network, a project designed to upgrade the transit authority to service the people of New Orleans.

Upgrades from the previous lines include more access to jobs and landmarks, reduced wait times, longer service times, and faster transfers/connections.

On July 18, 2022, the authority released Le Pass, a new trip planner and ticket app. It includes tickets and tracking for both RTA and Jefferson Transit busses. On August 29, 2022, RTA shut down ticket buying on the old RTA GoMobile app. Le Pass updated from the old routes on September 25, 2022.

No changes were made to the streetcars or ferries.

Bus and streetcar routes

Current bus routes

List of streetcar routes
2 Riverfront Streetcar (currently combined with 49)
12 St. Charles Streetcar (24-hour service)
47 Canal Streetcar to Cemeteries (24-hour service)
48 Canal Streetcar to City Park/Museum (24-hour service)
49 Rampart-St. Claude Streetcar Line (currently blocked due to Hard Rock hotel collapse, partially combined with 2 Riverfront as 49 UPT-Riverfront)

Former routes

1 Easy Rider Downtown Shuttle
3 Vieux Carré
5 Marigny-Bywater
10 Tchoupitoulas
13 St. Charles Shuttle
14 Jackson
15 Freret
16 S Claiborne
19 Nashville Express
20 Nashville
22 Broadway
24 Napoleon
28 M L King
30 Airline
34 Carrollton Express
39 Tulane
40 West End Express
41 West End
42 Canal – Cemeteries
43 Canal Boulevard – Lake Vista
44 Canal Boulevard Express – Lake Vista
45 Canal – City Park
46 Orleans (originally 46 City Park)
48 Esplanade
49 Lakeview
50 St. Bernard – Senate
51 St. Bernard – Lake Terrace
52 St. Bernard – L. C. Simon
53 Gentilly
54 Mirabeau (originally 54 Cartier)
56 Elysian Fields Express
58 Franklin Express
59 Congress
60 Hayne
63 New Orleans East Owl
64 Lake Forest Express
65 Six Flags Express (originally 65 Plaza Park-and-Ride)
65 Read-Crowder Express
66 Chef Menteur Highway Express
67 Crowder
69 New Orleans East Owl Loop
70 Read – Hayne
71 Read – Casino
72 Paris Road Express
73 Oak Island Loop
80 Louisa
81 Almonaster
82 Desire
83 Lower Ninth Ward
85 Barracks
88 St. Claude – Barracks
89 St. Claude – Refinery
90 Carrollton
94 Broad
96 Broad Rapid
97 Broad – Oak Island
98 Broad – Village de L'est
99 Broad – NASA
100 Algiers Owl
101 Algiers Point
102 General Meyer
103 General Meyer/Pace
104 Algiers Park-and-Ride
105 Aurora
106 Aurora Express
106 Aurora Local
107 General DeGaulle
108 Algiers Local
114 General DeGaulle-Sullen
115 General DeGaulle-Tullis
202 Kenner Park-and-Ride
408 Algiers Local-L.B. Landry

Governance
The body in charge of making major decisions for the RTA is the Board of Commissioners. The board consists of appointees by the Mayor of New Orleans and of some appointees by the President of Jefferson Parish. The RTA Board has the overall authority for transit in New Orleans including setting fares, overseeing service and operations, developing operating budgets, approving each year's annual transportation development plan, and deciding upon capital purchases and expansions.

Under contract to the RTA Board of Commissioners, Transdev formerly managed all day-to-day aspects of the transit agency on behalf of the RTA Board. Transdev handled operations and service, safety issues, vehicle maintenance, customer care, route design and scheduling, human resources, administration, ridership growth, capital planning, grant administration, communications, purchasing, and other agency functions. Transdev was under contract to and reported to the RTA Board of Commissioners. The company operates public transportation for some 5,000 transit authorities around the world. Transdev (then Veolia Transport) was hired in 2008.

, Transdev no longer manages the RTA. All bus, streetcar, and paratransit operators, and also maintenance personnel, are now employees of RTA. Ferry services continue to be operated for RTA by LabMar Ferry Services.

See also
 Streetcars in New Orleans
 List of light-rail transit systems

References

External links
 New Orleans Regional Transit Authority
 Bus Schedules & Maps
 Ride New Orleans, a not-for-profit transportation policy and research organization.

Government agencies established in 1979
Bus transportation in Louisiana
Passenger rail transportation in Louisiana
Intermodal transportation authorities in Louisiana
Transportation in New Orleans
Light rail in Louisiana
Bus rapid transit in Louisiana